Hõralaid is a small, uninhabited Estonian island of approximately 20 hectares in the Baltic Sea.

Hõralaid belongs to the village of Vahtrepa in Pühalepa Parish and is administered by Hiiu County. It lies 1.5 km off the east coast of the island of Hiiumaa and is approximately 1.5 km southeast of the small island of Vohilaid. During normal sea water levels, the water depth between Hõralaid and Vohilaid is ca 0.6m, making the distance passable by walking in the sea.

See also
List of islands of Estonia

References

External links
WorldCityDB.com

Uninhabited islands of Estonia
Hiiumaa Parish
Estonian islands in the Baltic